"BareNaked" is the first single from actress-singer Jennifer Love Hewitt's fourth studio album, BareNaked (2002).The single peaked at  6 in Australia, No. 24 on the US Billboard Bubbling Under Hot 100 chart, and No. 26 in New Zealand.

Commercial performance
In the United States, "BareNaked" debuted at its peak of number 24 on the Billboard Bubbling Under Hot 100 chart, spending only one week on the chart. On the Billboard Adult Pop Songs chart, it peaked at number 31 and spent 10 weeks on the chart. "BareNaked" also reached number 35 on the Billboard Mainstream Top 40 chart and spent six weeks on the chart.

In Australia, "BareNaked" debuted at number 18 on the ARIA Singles Chart. After four weeks, it climbed into the top 10 and peaked at number six, remaining in the top 50 for 11 weeks. In New Zealand, the song reached number 26 and spent 13 weeks on the RIANZ Singles Chart. In Netherlands, the song peaked at number 73 and spent 10 weeks on the chart, while in the Flanders region of Belgium, "BareNaked" reached number six on the Ultratip Bubbling Under chart.

Track listings
Australian CD single
 "BareNaked" (radio version) – 3:19
 "BareNaked" (album version) – 3:41
 "First Time" (album version) – 3:48
 "Rock the Roll" (album version) – 3:43

European CD single
 "BareNaked" (CD Pro version)
 "BareNaked" (album version)

Charts

Release history

References

2002 singles
2002 songs
Jennifer Love Hewitt songs
Jive Records singles
Music videos directed by Liz Friedlander
Songs written by Guy Erez
Songs written by Meredith Brooks